Michele Brown may refer to:

Michele Brown (New Jersey official), American lawyer
Michele Brown (athlete) (born 1939), Australian high jumper

See also
Michelle Brown (disambiguation)